Park is a local government ward within Tunbridge Wells borough in Kent, England.  It is made up of the Camden Park estate, the formerly separate village of Hawkenbury containing a regional Land Registry, Dunorlan Park and the Forest Road area, off which can be found the Tunbridge Wells Cemetery & Crematorium and Nevill Golf Club.

The majority of the ward falls within the Anglican parish of St. Peter's (on Bayhall Road), with a United Reformed Church (on Forest Road) in Hawkenbury and a Salvation Army mission, also on Bayhall Road.

The ward is represented by three councillors, all of which are (as of 2007) Conservatives.  The elections are contested by the Liberal Democrats and, for the first time in 2007, by the United Kingdom Independence Party.

Demography 

At the 2001 UK census, the Park electoral ward had a population of 6,525. The ethnicity was 96.9% white, 1.3% mixed race, 1.1% Asian, 0.4% black and 0.3% other. The place of birth of residents was 90.5% United Kingdom, 0.9% Republic of Ireland, 2.4% other Western European countries, and 6.2% elsewhere. Religion was recorded as 72.8% Christian, 0.2% Buddhist, 0.4% Hindu, 0.1% Sikh, 0.3% Jewish, and 0.8% Muslim. 17.4% were recorded as having no religion, 0.3% had an alternative religion and 7.7% did not state their religion.

The economic activity of residents aged 16–74 was 45.5% in full-time employment, 10.1% in part-time employment, 11% self-employed, 2% unemployed, 2% students with jobs, 2.5% students without jobs, 14.5% retired, 7% looking after home or family, 2.9% permanently sick or disabled and 2.6% economically inactive for other reasons. The industry of employment of residents was 13.7% retail, 8.5% manufacturing, 4.5% construction, 18.7% real estate, 10.6% health and social work, 7.4% education, 6.4% transport and communications, 4.7% public administration, 3.7% hotels and restaurants, 13.7% finance, 1.1% agriculture and 7% other. Compared with national figures, the ward had a relatively high proportion of workers in finance and real estate. There were a relatively low proportion in agriculture, construction, manufacturing, hotels and restaurants. Of the ward's residents aged 16–74, 31.3% had a higher education qualification or the equivalent, compared with 19.9% nationwide.

References

Politics of the Borough of Tunbridge Wells